Osthoff's law is an Indo-European sound law which states that long vowels shorten when followed by a resonant (Proto-Indo-European language (PIE) *m, *n, *l, *r, *y, *w), followed in turn by another consonant (i.e. in a closed syllable environment). It is named after German Indo-Europeanist Hermann Osthoff, who first formulated it.

Overview
The law operated in most of the Proto-Indo-European daughter languages, with notable exceptions being the Indo-Iranian and Tocharian branches in which the difference between long and short PIE diphthongs was clearly preserved.

Compare:
 PIE *dyēws "skyling, sky god" > Vedic Sanskrit dyā́us, but Ancient Greek , with an ordinary diphthong.

The term Osthoff's law is usually properly applied to the described phenomenon in Ancient Greek, which itself was an independent innovation from similar developments occurring in Latin and other Indo-European languages. However, the term is often used loosely as a cover term referring to all shortening of long diphthongs in closed syllables.

Osthoff's law is, in some version valid, for Greek, Latin, and Celtic but not for Indo-Iranian and Tocharian.

Germanic
Osthoff's law also probably applied in Germanic, although there is very little evidence to support or refute that claim. Some examples might be:
  "meat" > 
  "young" >

Balto-Slavic
The traditional school of Balto-Slavic linguistics posits compensatory lengthening of liquid diphthongs before laryngeals. Following this, long vowels become acuted, and the long vowels subsequently shorten again due to Osthoff's law, leaving an acuted liquid diphthong. For example:

 PIE  "birch" > PBSl. *bḗrźas >  > Lithuanian , Serbo-Croatian  (by liquid metathesis).

Some linguists, most notably Kortlandt and Derksen, reject the idea of compensatory lengthening before laryngeals, instead positing that the acute reflects laryngeals directly. Moreover, they reject Osthoff's law for Proto-Balto-Slavic, and reconstruct long vowels intact, but only if they are inherited from Proto-Indo-European.

See also
 Szemerényi's law
 Stang's law

Notes

References
 
 

Sound laws
Proto-Indo-European language